Santa Maria do Suaçuí is a municipality in the state of Minas Gerais in the Southeast region of Brazil.

People
Santa Maria do Suaçuí is the hometown of Rui Ricardo Dias, which plays Luiz Inácio Lula da Silva in the film Lula, o filho do Brasil.

See also
List of municipalities in Minas Gerais

References

Municipalities in Minas Gerais